The Farmingdale School District is a community public school district that serves students in pre-kindergarten through eighth grade from Farmingdale in Monmouth County, New Jersey, United States.

As of the 2020–21 school year, the district, comprised of one school, had an enrollment of 160 students and 24.2 classroom teachers (on an FTE basis), for a student–teacher ratio of 6.6:1. In the 2016–17 school year, Farmingdale had the 34th-smallest enrollment of any school district in the state, with 161 students.

The district is classified by the New Jersey Department of Education as being in District Factor Group "DE", the fifth-highest of eight groupings. District Factor Groups organize districts statewide to allow comparison by common socioeconomic characteristics of the local districts. From lowest socioeconomic status to highest, the categories are A, B, CD, DE, FG, GH, I and J.

Public school students in ninth through twelfth grades attend Howell High School, together with students from portions of Howell. The school is part of the Freehold Regional High School District, which also serves students from Colts Neck Township, Englishtown, Freehold Borough, Freehold Township, Manalapan Township and Marlboro. As of the 2020–21 school year, the high school had an enrollment of 2,094 students and 134.2 classroom teachers (on an FTE basis), for a student–teacher ratio of 15.6:1.

School
Farmingdale Elementary School served 160 students in pre-kindergarten through eighth grade as of the 2020–21 school year.

Administration
Core members of the district's administration are:
Edith Conroy, Superintendent
Christina Moskal, Business Administrator / Board Secretary

Board of education
The district's board of education has five members who set policy and oversee the fiscal and educational operation of the district through its administration. As a Type II school district, the board's trustees are elected directly by voters to serve three-year terms of office on a staggered basis, with either one or two seats up for election each year held (since 2012) as part of the November general election. The board appoints a superintendent to oversee the district's day-to-day operations and a business administrator to supervise the business functions of the district.

References

External links
Farmingdale Elementary School

School Data for the Farmingdale School District, National Center for Education Statistics
Howell High School
Freehold Regional High School District

School Data for the Freehold Regional High School District, National Center for Education Statistics

Farmingdale, New Jersey
New Jersey District Factor Group DE
School districts in Monmouth County, New Jersey
Public K–8 schools in New Jersey